is a Japanese manga one-shot written and illustrated by Keiko Takemiya. It was originally published in the December 1970 issue of the manga magazine Bessatsu Shōjo Comic under the title . It is the first work in the  genre (male–male romance manga, sometimes referred to as yaoi or "boys' love").

The story is a loosely adapted and condensed version of Takemiya's later manga series Kaze to Ki no Uta, and follows the relationship between a Roma teenaged boy and the son of a wealthy family. Takemiya's publishers had declined to publish Kaze to Ki no Uta, owing to its homoerotic subject material and their refusal to publish stories focused on male protagonists. She was ultimately able to publish Sunroom Nite by submitting the story to her editor at Bessatsu Shōjo Comic immediately before the issue's publication deadline, thus foreclosing any attempts to edit or reject the story. Upon its publication, Sunroom Nite was a critical success; it is credited with establishing male–male romance as a discrete category of manga, and launching Takemiya's career as a manga artist in earnest.

Plot
, the teenaged son of a Roma fortuneteller, regularly visits an abandoned mansion to spend time in its sunroom. The siblings befriend Serge, and invite him to continue visiting the sunroom. Serge and Étoile gradually grow closer, though Étoile becomes deeply depressed and falls ill after Serge demurs from his romantic advances. Étoile's mother forbids the two from seeing each other, prompting Serge to infiltrate the mansion to visit him. Reunited, Étoile asks Serge to kiss him, which he obliges; Étoile then commits suicide by grabbing Serge's hand and using it to plunge a knife into his own stomach.

Production

Context

Keiko Takemiya made her amateur debut as a manga artist in 1967, when her manga  submitted to the magazine COM was published as a "Monthly Newcomer Honorable Mention", and made her professional debut in 1967 or 1968. Having grown up reading  manga (manga for boys), Takemiya was interested in creating manga that featured boys instead of girls, and especially "friendships" between boys. She had previously been introduced to literature, artwork, music, and films that depicted relationships between males by her friend , and was influenced by Taruho Inagaki's essay  to make "" ( "boy love") the core of her creative work.

The  manga (girls' manga) publishing culture into which Takemiya made her debut was highly restrictive, and her editors at Shūkan Shōjo Comic refused to publish stories featuring male protagonists.  stories in general were marketed to an audience of children, were focused on uncomplicated subject material such as familial drama or romantic comedy, and favored Cinderella-like female protagonists defined by their passivity. Over the course of the 1970s, a new generation of  artists would emerge who would introduce a greater degree of narrative and thematic complexity to the genre, collectively referred to as the Year 24 Group. The group, of which Takemiya was a member, contributed significantly to the development of  manga by expanding it to incorporate elements of science fiction, historical fiction, adventure fiction, and same-sex romance: both male–male ( and ) and female–female.

In September 1970, Takemiya began drawing a manga tie-in for the television series  in Shūkan Shōjo Comic, though she was unenthusiastic about the series because she found the material uninspiring. A one-shot (single chapter manga) adaptation had been publicly announced for publication in the December 1970 issue of the supplemental magazine Bessatsu Shōjo Comic, which Takemiya had little interest in writing. Masuyama suggested that she instead submit a  story, which Takemiya agreed to.

Development
By the early 1970s, Takemiya had already conceived of the plot and characters for what would become her acclaimed 1976  series Kaze to Ki no Uta, but was unable to find a publisher for the series. Consequently, she sought to publish a "compact" version of Kaze to Ki no Uta in the form of Sunroom Nite. Knowing that a male–male romance story was likely to be heavily edited or rejected by her editors, Takemiya included the character of Angel, which gave the story the impression of a love triangle narrative. By having one of the central characters be a young girl, Sunroom Nite was able to "barely maintain the appearance of a  manga", with Takemiya remarking that Angel's inclusion "made it easier to tell the story. If there were only two boys, there would be no way to tell the story."

Takemiya has described Sunroom Nite as the "foundation" of Kaze to Ki no Uta, with both works sharing common narrative and thematic elements. Both stories focus on a Roma teenager named Serge Battour, and his relationship with a blonde boy who dies at the end of the story; Serge and Étoile have been described as "prototypes" of Serge and Gilbert, the primary couple in Kaze to Ki no Uta. A character similar to Carl Maïsser, a secondary character in Kaze to Ki no Uta, also appears in Sunroom Nite.

Sunroom Nite contains nudity and scenes of male characters kissing each other, which was considered radical for  manga of the time. The story begins and concludes with a monologue by Serge mourning Étoile, a narrative structure similar to that of Kaze to Ki no Uta.

Release

Takemiya submitted a manuscript of the finished manga under the same title as the previously announced one-shot, but with completely different content, immediately before the publication deadline for Bessatsu Shōjo Comic. Her editor  called Takemiya to the Shogakukan offices, where he expressed anger that the content was different from what had been discussed, but ultimately permitted the manga to be published as-is because there was no time to revise it. Takemiya stated in her 2019 memoir that this was the first and last time she changed the content of her manga without consulting the editor.

The 50-page one-shot was published under the title Yuki to Hoshi to Tenshi to... in the December 1970 issue of Bessatsu Shōjo Comic. In all subsequent releases, it has been published under the title Sunroom Nite. In 1976, Asahi Sonorama published an anthology of short stories by Takemiya titled Sunroom Nite under its Sun Comics imprint, which contains the titular one-shot manga. In 1978, Chikuma Shobō also published an anthology containing Sunroom Nite, as part of its Keiko Takemiya Collection in the short-lived  ("Complete Collection of Modern Manga") series. The one-shot was similarly included in anthologies of Takemiya's manga published by Kadokawa Shoten in 1990 and Media Factory in 2002. In 2010,  released an e-book anthology titled Sunroom Nite, featuring the titular one-shot and five other short stories by Takemiya from the early 1970s. The e-book was the third of fifteen short story volumes released as part of the company's digital Keiko Takemiya Collection.

Reception

Critical reaction
Takemiya stated that she expected a public backlash for Sunroom Nite, but that she received mnay supportive letters from readers, and the story was favorably assessed in a reader survey organized by the magazine.

After the publication of Sunroom Nite, Takemiya says that was separately contacted by manga artists  and Ryoko Yamagishi through the editorial department at Shogakukan, both of whom had read the story. Yamagishi told Takemiya that she too was interested in drawing a  manga, but that her editors at Shueisha only permitted her to draw conventional  manga.

Legacy

Ishida similarly evaluates the series as an influential work that served as a starting point for manga about romance and sex between men created by women for a female audience. The positive critical recognition that Sunroom Nite received is credited with launching Takemiya's career as a manga artist in earnest.

Notes

References

Bibliography

 

1970 manga
Keiko Takemiya
Romance anime and manga
Shogakukan manga
Shōjo manga
Shōnen-ai anime and manga